Darrell Hadari Britt-Gibson (born August 4, 1986) is an American actor, known for his role as Darius "O-Dog" Hill on the HBO series The Wire. He has also appeared on the Showtime series Californication, the Starz series Power, the FX series You're the Worst, and the HBO series Barry and We Own This City. He has also starred in the films Keanu (2016), 20th Century Women (2016), Three Billboards Outside Ebbing, Missouri (2017), and Judas and the Black Messiah (2021).

Early life
Britt-Gibson was born and raised in Silver Spring, Maryland. He is the son of author and journalist Donna Britt and her first husband, Greg Gibson. Britt-Gibson has one older brother, Justin Britt-Gibson, a screenwriter, and one younger half-brother, Skye Merida, from his mother's remarriage to newspaper editor Kevin Merida. He attended Hampton University and thereafter transferred to the University of Maryland, Baltimore County, where he studied theater.

Career

Britt-Gibson made his acting debut in the recurring role of Darius "O-Dog" Hill on HBO's crime drama television series The Wire, starring in 8 episodes from 2006 to 2008. He then appeared in the film Toe to Toe (2009) as Leron, and 2 episodes of the web series Monday Wednesday Friday, also writing one of the episodes in which he starred. He has also guest starred in episodes of many television series, such as Southland, Shameless, The Bridge, and Major Crimes.

In 2014, Britt-Gibson had recurring roles on the series Californication as Darrell, Power as Rolla, and You're the Worst as Shitstain. Britt-Gibson was cast in the pilot of ABC's crime drama series Wicked City in the role of Diver Hawkes, but was subsequently recast after the pilot was ordered to series. In 2016, he co-starred in the comedy film Keanu, portraying the role of Trunk.

Filmography

Film

Television

References

External links

 

21st-century American male actors
American male film actors
American male television actors
Living people
Male actors from Maryland
African-American actors
1986 births